Pietracupa is a comune (municipality) in the Province of Campobasso in the Italian region Molise, located about  northwest of Campobasso.

Pietracupa borders the following municipalities: Bagnoli del Trigno, Duronia, Fossalto, Salcito, Torella del Sannio.

References

Cities and towns in Molise